12 Bar Bruise is the debut studio album by Australian psychedelic rock band King Gizzard & the Lizard Wizard. It was released on 7 September 2012 on Flightless. It peaked at No. 14 on the ARIA Albums Chart after being released on vinyl in November 2018.

Recording
The album was self-recorded by the band, and several tracks used unconventional recording methods. One of these is featured on the album's title track – it was recorded through four iPhones placed around a room while Stu Mackenzie sang into one of them.

Track listing 
All tracks written by Stu Mackenzie, except where noted.

Vinyl releases have tracks 1–6 on side A, and tracks 7–12 on side B.

Personnel 
Credits for 12 Bar Bruise adapted from liner notes.

King Gizzard & the Lizard Wizard
Michael Cavanagh – drums
Cook Craig – guitar, vocals
Ambrose Kenny-Smith – harmonica, vocals
Stu Mackenzie – guitar, vocals 
Eric Moore – theremin, keys, percussion
Lucas Skinner – bass, vocals
Joe Walker – guitar, vocals

Additional musicians
Broderick Smith – spoken word 

Production
Paul Maybury – recording, mixing
King Gizzard – recording, mixing
Joseph Carra – mastering
Jason Galea – cover art
Ican Harem – inside cover
Lauren Bamford – insert photo

Charts

References

External links
 

2012 debut albums
King Gizzard & the Lizard Wizard albums
Flightless (record label) albums
Garage rock albums by Australian artists
Garage punk albums
Acid rock albums